Marang (est. pop. (2000 census): 4,896) is a town and the seat of Marang District, in the state of Terengganu, Malaysia. The town is located on the South China Sea coast on the main highway between Kuala Terengganu and Kuantan. The main economic activity in Marang is fishery and tourism.

Etymology 
The origin of the district's name is attributed to a Chinese entrepreneur of dried sea products known only by the name of Ma, who was one of the first settlers in the area. The sea products, consisting of fish and squid, are dried on racks called rang by the local populace. Given Ma owned all the rangs, the area became known as Ma rang (i.e. 'Ma's rangs'), which eventually became Marang.
According to a Malay teacher, the late Cikgu Osman, a teacher from Sek. Keb. Marang; Marang derives its name from Syed Muharram. The way the local pronounce Muharram, eventually became Marang.

Climate
Marang has a tropical rainforest climate (Af) with heavy to very heavy rainfall year-round.

References

External links
Official Website of Marang District Council
Visit Terengganu 2008 Blog
Rahman Bakar - Pegawai Pembangunan Parlimen Marang

Marang District
Towns in Terengganu